General elections were held in Namibia on 4 and 5 December 1994. There were two votes, one for president (the first time a president had been directly elected) and one for the National Assembly. Both elections were won by SWAPO, who won 53 of the 72 seats in the National Assembly, and whose candidate, Sam Nujoma, won the presidential election.

Results

President

National Assembly

By region

References

Presidential elections in Namibia
Namibia
Parliamentary election
Elections in Namibia
National Assembly (Namibia)
Namibia